The Community of the Lipovan Russians in Romania (CRL; , ORL) is an ethnic minority political party in Romania representing the Lipovan community.

History
Established on 14 January 1990, the CRLR took part in the May 1990 general elections. Despite receiving only 0.13% of the vote, it received one seat in the Chamber of Deputies under the electoral law that allows for political parties representing ethnic minority groups to be exempt from the electoral threshold. It has been receiving a seat in every election since.

Electoral history

Notable members
, member of parliament 2000–2018
, member of parliament 2018–2020, taking Ignat's seat after his death
, party president since 2016 and member of parliament since 2020

References

External links
Official website

Non-registered political parties in Romania
Political parties of minorities in Romania
1990 establishments in Romania
Political parties established in 1990
Russian diaspora political parties
Old Believer movement